Finnbogason is a surname of Icelandic origin, meaning son of Finnbogi ( = Finn bow, Finnish bow ). In Icelandic names the name is not strictly a surname, but a patronymic. Notable people with the name include:

 Alfreð Finnbogason (born 1989), Icelandic football striker
 Birgir Finnbogason (born 1948), Icelandic handball player 
 Guðmundur Finnbogason (1873–1944), Icelandic philosopher; one of the first Icelandic psychologists
 Kjartan Finnbogason (born 1986), Icelandic football striker
 Kristján Finnbogason (born 1971), Icelandic football goalkeeper
 Kristján Flóki Finnbogason (born 1995), Icelandic football forward

Icelandic-language surnames